This is a list of functional programming topics.

Foundational concepts

Programming paradigm
Declarative programming
Programs as mathematical objects
Function-level programming
Purely functional programming
Total functional programming
Lambda programming
Static scoping
Higher-order function
Referential transparency

Lambda calculus

Currying
Lambda abstraction
Church–Rosser theorem
Extensionality
Church numeral

Combinatory logic

Fixed point combinator
SKI combinator calculus
B, C, K, W system
SECD machine
Graph reduction machine

Intuitionistic logic

Sequent, sequent calculus
Natural deduction
Intuitionistic type theory
BHK interpretation
Curry–Howard correspondence
Linear logic
Game semantics

Type theory

Typed lambda calculus
Typed and untyped languages
Type signature
Type inference
Datatype
Algebraic data type (generalized)
Type variable
First-class value
Polymorphism
Calculus of constructions

Denotational semantics

Domain theory
Directed complete partial order
Knaster–Tarski theorem

Category theory

Cartesian closed category
Yoneda lemma

Operational issues

Graph reduction
Combinator graph reduction
Strict programming language
Lazy evaluation, eager evaluation
Speculative evaluation
Side effect
Assignment
Setq
Closure
Continuation
Continuation passing style
Operational semantics
State transition system
Simulation preorder
Bisimulation
Monads in functional programming
Exception handling
Garbage collection

Programming languages

Clean
Clojure
Elixir
Erlang
FP
F#
Haskell
Glasgow Haskell Compiler
Gofer
Hugs
Template Haskell
ISWIM
JavaScript
Kent Recursive Calculator
Lisp
AutoLISP
Common Lisp
Emacs Lisp
Scheme
Mercury
Miranda
ML (:Category:ML programming language family)
OCaml
Standard ML
Pure, predecessor Q
Q (programming language from Kx Systems)
Quantum programming
Scala
SISAL
Ωmega

 
Functional programming
Functional programming topics
Functional programming topics